Odostomella is a genus of sea snails, marine gastropod mollusks in the family Pyramidellidae, the pyrams and their allies.

Species
Species within the genus Odostomella include:
 Odostomella africana Schander, 1994
 † Odostomella awatubu (Nomura, 1938) 
 Odostomella bicincta (Tiberi, 1868)
 Odostomella bucquoyi (Locard, 1886)
 Odostomella carceralis Pimenta, Absalao & Alencar, 2000
 Odostomella chorea (Hedley, 1909)
 Odostomella doliolum (Philippi, 1844)
 Odostomella farica (Bartsch, 1915)
 Odostomella germaini (Dautzenberg & Fischer, 1906)
 Odostomella graffeuilli Saurin, 1959
 Odostomella innocens Thiele, 1925
 Odostomella knudseni Schander, Hori & Lundberg, 1999
 Odostomella metata (Hedley, 1907)
 Odostomella nuptialis Thiele, 1925
 Odostomella opaca (Hedley, 1906)
 Odostomella patricia (Pilsbry, 1918)
 Odostomella pupa (Watson, 1886)
 Odostomella pupina (Saurin, 1959)
 Odostomella rufolineata (A. Adams, 1863)
 Odostomella virginalis Thiele, 1925
The following species were brought into synonymy
 Odostomella jeffreysiana (Monterosato, 1884): synonym of  Chrysallida jeffreysiana (Monterosato, 1884)
 Odostomella nuptalis [sic]: synonym of Odostomella nuptialis Thiele, 1925
 Odostomella padangensis Thiele, 1925: synonym of Salassia padangensis (Thiele, 1925)
 Odostomella purpurea Saurin, 1959: synonym of Herviera gliriella (Melvill & Standen, 1896)

References

 Schander C., Hori S. & Lundberg J. (1999), Anatomy, phylogeny and biology of Odostomella and Herviera, with the description of a new species of Odostomella (Mollusca, Heterostropha, Pyramidellidae).Ophelia 51 (1): 39-76
 Gofas, S.; Le Renard, J.; Bouchet, P. (2001). Mollusca. in: Costello, M.J. et al. (Ed.) (2001). European register of marine species: a check-list of the marine species in Europe and a bibliography of guides to their identification. Collection Patrimoines Naturels. 50: pp. 180–213.

External links
 To World Register of Marine Species

Pyramidellidae